Elgin City Football Club (also known as City or The Black and Whites) is a professional senior football club based in Elgin, Moray.

Elgin was founded in 1893 and originally played their football in the Highland Football League. The club was granted league status in 2000. They currently compete in the Scottish Professional Football League in Scottish League Two.

History
The present Elgin City club was formed on 10 August 1893 by the amalgamation of two Elgin sides, Rovers (Formed 1887) and Vale of Lossie (Founded 1888). However the name Elgin City was used by two clubs prior to this. The first was formed in October 1879, but lasted for only a short time. The second Elgin City was formed in October 1884 and lasted until early 1887.

The present club's first major honour came in the 1898–99 season when they became the first team outside Inverness to win the North of Scotland Cup, beating Clachnacuddin 2–1. However, they failed to record any more success aside from the Elgin District Cup until 1924 when they again won the North of Scotland Cup a second time. Since then they have won honours with relative frequency.

In 1968 the club reached the quarter-finals of the Scottish Cup, the furthest into the tournament that a Highland League club has ever progressed.

The club was granted league status in 2000 when the SPL was expanded to twelve clubs leaving two places to be filled. Peterhead joined them in the Third Division from the Highland League. Since joining the SFL, Elgin have struggled with consistency, but in season 2003–04 they recaptured the North of Scotland Cup.

In December 2005, assistant manager Kenny Black saw a takeover bid thwarted at the eleventh hour. Many fans saw his bid as the best chance to move upward through the leagues, but a controversial sale of shares in the club meant Black's bid was defeated. David Robertson, manager at the time, also chose to leave the club. Former Lossiemouth manager Graham Tatters was subsequently named as Elgin's new chairman. Club captain at the time Jamie McKenzie was appointed caretaker manager and a run of good results was rewarded with the Manager of the Month award for December 2005; at the time he was the youngest serving manager in the UK.

Early in 2006, former Aberdeen, Ross County and Scotland international, Brian Irvine was appointed manager. However, following a very poor start to the 2006–07 season, he left the club despite having forged a good relationship with the fans.

After a brief spell under interim manager Graham Tatters (during which they lost to Highland League Deveronvale in the Scottish Cup Third round), former Clachnacuddin manager Robbie Williamson was appointed in January 2007. Williamson quit on 20 December 2008, before a game with Berwick Rangers. He left the team bottom of the Third Division after just two wins from 15 matches.

On 23 January 2009, former player of Everton, Norwich City, Dundee, Dunfermline Athletic and Kilmarnock, Ross Jack was named as the club's new manager, signing a three-and-a-half-year-contract. He was a former player-manager of Montrose and former assistant coach at Ross County. On 5 January 2013, Elgin City became the first club to take a point from Rangers at Ibrox in the season, with the game finishing 1–1. Ross Jack left the club on 22 January 2014 after five years in charge, with the club lying in second bottom position of the division. In his time at the club, the high point was reaching the divisional play-offs at the end of season 2011–12.

Former player and assistant manager Barry Wilson was appointed as manager on 28 January 2014 and announced his intention to have a squad of north-based players. Barry Wilson resigned as manager on 17 November 2014 and was replaced by Jim Weir 10 days later. On 30 April 2016, they sealed the runners up spot in Scottish League Two and entered the promotion Play-offs. However, they lost 5–1 on aggregate to Clyde and remained in League Two. The club finished fifth in 2017, missing out on a play off spot by one point. 2018 saw another mid-table finish, as the club ended the campaign in sixth place on 49 points. In 2019, the club finished in eighth place, 24 points clear of the playoff spot.

Ground
Elgin City have played at Borough Briggs since 1921 when it replaced Cooper Park.

Kit history

First-team squad

On loan

Club officials

Board
Chairman: Graham Tatters
Directors: Isla Benzie, Cecil Jack, Stephen Scott, Grant Shewan
General Manager: Keiran Carty

Coaching staff 
Manager: Gavin Price
Assistant manager: Jim Weir
First-team coach: Charlie Charlesworth
Goalkeeping coach: Stevie Dunn
Sports analyst: Gordon Nicolson
Club doctor: James Jack
Physiotherapists: Andrew Jones, Catherine Graham
Kit Controller: John Jack Jnr
Community & Academy Operations Manager: Craigh Stewart

Honours
Highland League Champions: 1931–32, 1934–35, 1952–53, 1955–56 (After Play-off), 1959–60, 1960–61 (After Play-off), 1962–63, 1964–65, 1965–66, 1967–68, 1968–69, 1969–70, 1973–74, 1989–90 (14)

Elgin City had won the 1992–93 but were stripped of title for bringing forward their final match of the season, so that two players due to serve a suspension could play.

Highland League Cup Winners: 1959–60, 1966–67, 1982–83, 1990–91, 1997–98 (5)

Scottish Qualifying Cup (North) Winners: 1935–36, 1937–38, 1959–60, 1964–65, 1967–68, 1970–71, 1989–90 (7)

North of Scotland Cup Winners: 1898–99, 1923–24, 1936–37, 1954–55, 1955–56, 1960–61, 1961–62, 1967–68, 1968–69, 1970–71, 1972–73, 1975–76, 1982–83, 1988–89, 1989–90, 1997–98, 1998–99, 2003–04 (18)

Club records
Win: 18–1 v Brora Rangers on 6 February 1960 (North of Scotland Cup)

Defeat: 1–14 v Heart of Midlothian on 4 February 1939 (1938–39 Scottish Cup)

Home attendance: 12,608 v Arbroath on 17 February 1968 (1967–68 Scottish Cup)

Away attendance: 46,406 v Rangers on 5 January 2013 (Scottish League, Third Division)

Most Scottish League Appearances: Brian Cameron 342 (39) (2008–)

Most Individual Goals in a Scottish League Match: 4 by Craig Gunn v. Berwick Rangers, 6 August 2011 at Borough Briggs (Won 4–1)

Most Individual Goals in a Scottish Cup Match: 4 by Shane Sutherland v Hawick Royal Albert, 26 November 2016 at Borough Briggs (Won 8–1)

Most Scottish League Goals in a Season: Craig Gunn 21 (2015–16)

Most Scottish League Goals: Craig Gunn 114 (2009–2017)

Most Highland League Appearances: Neil MacLennan 438 (1979–1980, 1983–2000)

Most Individual Goals in a Highland League Match: 8 by Charlie Cormack v Nairn County, 29 August 1936 at Borough Briggs (Won 12–2)

Most Highland League Goals in a Season: Matt Armstrong 52 From 30 Appearances (1947–48)

Most Highland League Goals: Gerry Graham 259 From 257 Appearances (1965–1974)

Most Goals in a Season: 66 by Willie Grant From 40 Appearances (1960–61)

Record Goalscorer: Gerry Graham (371) (1965–1974)

Managers since entry to the SFL

 Alex Caldwell (24 February 2000 – 9 December 2002)
 Harry McFadden (9 December 2002 – 2003, caretaker)
 David Robertson (2003–2 December 2005)
 Jamie McKenzie (2005–2006, caretaker)
 Brian Irvine (26 January 2006 – December 2006)
 Graham Tatters (2006–2007, caretaker)
 Robbie Williamson (11 January 2007 – 21 December 2008)
 David McConnachie (2008–2009, caretaker)
 Ross Jack (23 January 2009 – 22 January 2014)
 Barry Wilson (28 January 2014 – 17 November 2014)
 Jim Weir (27 November 2014 – 1 October 2017)
 Gavin Price (1 October 2017–)

References

External links
 Official website
 Supporters' trust website
 Detailed history at fitbastats.com

 
Football clubs in Scotland
Association football clubs established in 1893
Football in Moray
Former Highland Football League teams
1893 establishments in Scotland
Scottish Football League teams
Scottish Professional Football League teams